Ballina GAA is a Gaelic Athletic Association club that plays hurling and Gaelic football. The club is located in the village of Ballina, County Tipperary in Ireland. The club plays in the North division of Tipperary GAA.

History
It was founded in 1885 and won its first championship - the North division Junior Hurling Championship - in 1932. The club has not won a senior county title in any code.

Honours
Munster Intermediate Club Hurling Championship  (0): (Runners-Up 2013)
 Munster Junior Club Football Championship Runners-Up 2021
 Tipperary Intermediate Hurling Championship (1):  2013
 Tipperary Intermediate Football Championship (1): 2022
 North Tipperary Intermediate Hurling Championship (1): 2013
 North Tipperary Intermediate Football Championship (1): 2004
 Tipperary Junior A Hurling Championship (2): 1984, 1996
 North Tipperary Junior A Hurling Championship (5): 1932, 1967, 1984, 1990, 1996 (Runners-up 1912)
 Tipperary Junior A Football Championship (2):  2003, 2021
 North Tipperary Junior A Football Championship (5): 2000, 2002, 2003, 2020, 2021

References

External links
Club website (archived 2011)
Tipperary GAA website (archived 2013)

Gaelic games clubs in County Tipperary